Lucerne is an unincorporated community in Knox County, in the U.S. state of Ohio.

History
Lucerne was founded in the 1830s. The community was named after Lake Lucerne, in Switzerland. A post office called Youngs Mills was established in 1830, and renamed Lucerne in 1850; the post office closed in 1873.

References

Unincorporated communities in Knox County, Ohio
1830 establishments in Ohio
Populated places established in 1830
Unincorporated communities in Ohio